Maison d'arrêt are a category of prisons in France, in Belgium and other French-speaking countries, which hold prisoners awaiting trial or sentencing, or those being held for less than one year, similar to county jails in the United States.

In the Netherlands the Huis van Bewaring, also known as the Huis van Arrest exists, having the same function, with the name being a literal translation from the French equivalent.  

Prisons in France
Prisons in Belgium
Prisons in the Netherlands